Gelonaetha hirta, commonly known as Hibiscus Long-horned beetle, or Long horn teak borer, is a species of longhorn beetle. It is distributed in Sri Lanka, India, Myanmar, Thailand, Laos, Hainan Island, Taiwan, Borneo, Philippines, Micronesia, Polynesia and West Indies.

Biology
Adult is reddish brown to dark brown in colour. There is tinge of greyish depressed pubescence with tawny setae. Head densely punctate and prothorax densely rugulose to punctate. Elytra densely punctate where each elytron with one or two raised longitudinal lines. Abdomen very sparsely punctate. Adult is about 9 mm to 16 mm. in length.

Host plants of the larva include: Hibiscus tiliaceus, Anogeissus latifolia, Berrya cordifolia, Dipterocarpus, Grewia, Heritiera fomes, Tectona grandis, and Shorea laevis.

References 

Cerambycinae
Insects of Sri Lanka
Insects of India
Insects described in 1850